John Ingebrigt Rognes (18 June 1902 – 30 July 1949) was a Norwegian military officer and Milorg pioneer.

Career
Rognes was born in Trondheim to police officer I. Rognes and Marie Johanne Iversen, and was married to Ragna Brandt. He graduated from the Norwegian Military Academy in 1924. During the occupation of Norway by Nazi Germany he organized early military resistance, along with Olaf Helset and Paal Frisvold. In 1941 he fled to the United Kingdom, where he assumed a central position with the Norwegian Army in exile in Britain.

References

1902 births
1949 deaths
Norwegian Army personnel of World War II
Norwegian prisoners of war in World War II
World War II prisoners of war held by Germany
Norwegian resistance members
People from Trondheim